Poy Gum Lee (1900–1968) was a Chinese-American architect. Lee is known for his Art Deco buildings with Chinese architectural influence or "Chinese Deco" in Shanghai as well as in Chinatown, Manhattan, New York City.

Early life and education 
On January 14, 1900, Lee was born at 13 Mott Street in Chinatown, Manhattan, New York City. Lee's parents were Lee Yick Dep and Ng Lan Yin (also known as Ng She); Lee was the eldest child and he had 14 siblings. He grew up at 32 Mott Street above the family store in the Chinatown neighborhood in New York City.

In 1920, Lee earned a degree in Architecture from Pratt Institute. Lee took architecture extension classes at Massachusetts Institute of Technology (MIT) in 1921 and later at Columbia University in 1922.

Career 
During World War I, he served in the United States Army. By 1923, Lee and his family moved to China where he worked on various architecture projects and earned him admiration for his work. He worked as an architect in China for 25 years. Hired by the Young Men’s Christian Association’s China Building Bureau, he worked on 11 buildings for the YMCA and YWCA in China and also working on the Sun Yat-sen Mausoleum (1926-1929) and Sun Yat-sen Memorial Hall (1929-1931).

During World War II, Lee and his family lived in the French Concession neighborhood in Shanghai, China, where his home was confiscated by the Japanese. After World War II, Lee and his family returned to New York City in the United States.

Lee worked primarily in Manhattan's Chinatown after his return to the U.S. and worked with the New York City Housing Authority. Some of the postwar projects he worked on included the Chinese Consolidated Benevolent Association building in New York City (1959), On Leong Tong Merchant’s Association building (1948–1950), Kimlau War Memorial in Kimlau Square (1962), and Pagoda Theatre (1963).

Personal life 
In 1926, Lee married Pansy Choye in Shanghai, China. They have three daughters.

On March 24, 1968, Lee died in Bakersfield, California. He was 68 years old. Lee is buried at Greenlawn Cemetery in Bakersfield, California.

See also
Liu Jipiao
Robert Fan

References

Chinese architects
1900 births
1968 deaths
Art Deco architects
People from Chinatown, Manhattan
Pratt Institute alumni
American architects of Chinese descent
Chinese designers